Rysum is a village located 15 kilometers west of Emden in the region of East Frisia, Germany. It is home to the Rysum organ, one of the earliest pipe organs in playable condition.

External links
 Rysum official website
 The history of Rysum

Towns and villages in East Frisia
Villages in Lower Saxony
Krummhörn